Calais station may refer to:

Calais-Fréthun station, an international railway station in the suburbs of Calais, France
, a former railway station in the Port of Calais, France
Calais-Ville station, a railway station in the city centre of Calais, France
Les Fontinettes station, a junction railway station in the suburbs of Calais, France